William John Banville (born 8 December 1945) is an Irish novelist, short story writer, adapter of dramas and screenwriter. Though he has been described as "the heir to Proust, via Nabokov", Banville himself maintains that W. B. Yeats and Henry James are the two real influences on his work.

Banville has won the 1976 James Tait Black Memorial Prize, the 2003 International Nonino Prize, the 2005 Booker Prize, the 2011 Franz Kafka Prize, the 2013 Austrian State Prize for European Literature and the 2014 Prince of Asturias Award for Literature. He was elected a Fellow of the Royal Society of Literature in 2007. He is a former member of Aosdána, having voluntarily relinquished the financial stipend in 2001 to another, more impoverished, writer.

Banville was born and grew up in Wexford town in south-east Ireland.  He published his first novel, Nightspawn, in 1971. A second, Birchwood, followed two years later. "The Revolutions Trilogy", published between 1976 and 1982, comprises three works, each named in reference to a renowned scientist: Doctor Copernicus, Kepler and The Newton Letter. His next work, Mefisto, had a mathematical theme. His 1989 novel The Book of Evidence, shortlisted for the Booker Prize and winner of that year's Guinness Peat Aviation award, heralded a second trilogy, three works which deal in common with the work of art. "The Frames Trilogy" is completed by Ghosts and Athena, both published during the 1990s. Banville's thirteenth novel, The Sea, won the Booker Prize in 2005. In addition, he publishes crime novels as Benjamin Black — most of these feature the character of Quirke, an Irish pathologist based in Dublin.

Banville is considered a contender for the Nobel Prize in Literature. He lives in Dublin.

Early life and family
William John Banville was born to Agnes (née Doran) and Martin Banville, a garage clerk, in Wexford, Ireland. He is the youngest of three siblings; his older brother Vincent is also a novelist and has written under the name Vincent Lawrence as well as his own. His sister Anne Veronica "Vonnie" Banville-Evans has written both a children's novel and a memoir of growing up in Wexford. Banville stole a collection of Dylan Thomas's poetry from Wexford County Library while in his teens.

Banville was educated at CBS Primary, Wexford, a Christian Brothers school, and at St Peter's College, Wexford. Despite having intended to be a painter and an architect, he did not attend university. Banville has described this as "A great mistake. I should have gone. I regret not taking that four years of getting drunk and falling in love. But I wanted to get away from my family. I wanted to be free." Alternately he has stated that college would have had little benefit for him: "I don't think I would have learned much more, and I don't think I would have had the nerve to tackle some of the things I tackled as a young writer if I had been to university – I would have been beaten into submission by my lecturers."

After school he worked as a clerk at Aer Lingus, which allowed him to travel at deeply discounted rates. He took advantage of these rates to travel in Greece and Italy. On his return to Ireland, he became a sub-editor at The Irish Press, rising eventually to the position of chief sub-editor. before The Irish Press collapsed in 1995, Banville became a sub-editor at The Irish Times. He was appointed literary editor in 1998. The Irish Times, too, endured financial troubles, and Banville was offered the choice of taking a redundancy package or working as a features department sub-editor. He left.

Banville has two sons from a marriage to the American textile artist Janet Dunham, whom he met in the United States during the 1960s. Asked in 2012 about the breakdown of that marriage, Banville's immediate thoughts focused on the effect it had on his children; "It was hard on them", he said. Banville later went on to have two daughters from another relationship. He lives in Dublin.

Writing
Banville published his first book, a collection of short stories titled Long Lankin, in 1970. He has disowned his first published novel, Nightspawn, describing it as "crotchety, posturing, absurdly pretentious".

As an unknown writer in the 1980s, he toured Dublin's bookshops — "and we had a lot of bookshops back then" — around the time of the publication of his novel Kepler "and there wasn't a single one of any of my books anywhere". But, he noted in 2012, "I didn't feel badly about it because I was writing the kinds of books I wanted to write. And I had no one but myself to blame if I wasn't making money, that wasn't anybody's fault. Nobody was obliged to buy my books".

Since 1990, Banville has been a regular contributor to The New York Review of Books.

Banville has written three trilogies: the first, The Revolutions Trilogy, focused on great men of science and consisted of Doctor Copernicus (1976), Kepler (1981), and The Newton Letter (1982). He said he became interested in Kepler and other men of science after reading Arthur Koestler's The Sleepwalkers. He realised that, like him, scientists were trying to impose order in their work.

The second trilogy, sometimes referred to collectively as The Frames Trilogy, consists of The Book of Evidence (1989), with several of its characters being featured in Ghosts (1993); Athena (1995) is the third to feature an unreliable narrator and explore the power of works of art.

The third trilogy consists of Eclipse, Shroud and Ancient Light, all of which concern the characters Alexander and Cass Cleave.

He wrote fondly of John McGahern, who lost his job amid condemnation by his workplace and the Catholic Church for becoming intimately involved with a foreign woman. While on a book tour of the United States in March 2006, Banville received a telephone call: "I have bad news, I'm afraid. John Banville is dead". However, Banville was aware that McGahern had been unwell and, having performed the necessary checks to ensure that he was still alive, concluded that it was McGahern who was dead instead. And it was.

Beginning with Christine Falls, published in 2006, Banville has written crime fiction under the pen name Benjamin Black. He writes his Benjamin Black crime fiction much more quickly than he composes his literary novels. He appreciates his work as Black as a craft, while as Banville he is an artist. He considers crime writing, in his own words, as being "cheap fiction". In a July 2008 interview with Juan José Delaney in the Argentine newspaper La Nación, Banville was asked if his books had been translated into Irish. He replied that nobody would translate them and that he was often referred to pejoratively as a West Brit.

He wrote an account of Caravaggio's 1602 painting The Taking of Christ for the book Lines of Vision, released in 2014 to mark the 150th anniversary of the National Gallery of Ireland.

He provided a contribution to Sons+Fathers, a book published in 2015 to provide funds for the Irish Hospice Foundation's efforts to give care to terminally ill patients within their own homes.

Style
Banville is highly scathing of all of his work, stating of his books: "I hate them all ... I loathe them. They're all a standing embarrassment." Instead of dwelling on the past he is continually looking forward, "You have to crank yourself up every morning and think about all the awful stuff you did yesterday, and how you can compensate for that by doing better today." He does not read reviews of his work as he already knows — "better than any reviewer" — the places in which its faults lie.

His typical writing day begins with a drive from his home in Dublin to his office by the river. He writes from 9 a.m. until lunch. He then dines on bread, cheese and tea and resumes working until 6 p.m., at which time he returns home. He writes on two desks at right angles to each other, one facing a wall and the other facing a window through which he has no view and never cleans. He advises against young writers approaching him for advice: "I remind them as gently as I can, that they are on their own, with no help available anywhere". He has compared writing to the life of an athlete: "It's asking an awful lot of one's self. Every day you have to do your absolute best — it's a bit like being a sportsman. You have to perform at the absolute top of your game, six, seven, eight hours a day — that's very, very wearing".

Themes
Banville is considered by critics as a master stylist of English, and his writing has been described as perfectly crafted, beautiful, dazzling. He is known for his dark humour, and sharp, wintery wit. He has been described as "the heir to Proust, via Nabokov".

Don DeLillo describes Banville's work as "dangerous and clear-running prose", David Mehegan of The Boston Globe calls him "one of the great stylists writing in English today", Val Nolan in The Sunday Business Post calls his style "lyrical, fastidious, and occasionally hilarious"; The Observer described The Book of Evidence as "flawlessly flowing prose whose lyricism, patrician irony and aching sense of loss are reminiscent of Lolita." Gerry Dukes, reviewing The Sea in the Irish Independent, hailed Banville as a "lord of language".

Michael Ross has stated that Banville is "perhaps the only living writer capable of advancing fiction beyond the point reached by Beckett".

Banville has said that he is "trying to blend poetry and fiction into some new form". He writes in the Hiberno-English dialect and dreads this being lost if he were to move abroad as other Irish writers have done.

Four of Banville's novels (and one of Black's) have featured the trope of a character's eyes darting back and forth "like a spectator at a tennis match".

Literary influences

Banville said in an interview with The Paris Review that he liked Vladimir Nabokov's style; however, he went on, "But I always thought there was something odd about it that I couldn't quite put my finger on. Then I read an interview in which he admitted he was tone deaf." Heinrich von Kleist is influential, Banville having written adaptations of three of his plays (including ), as well as using the myth of Amphitryon as a basis for his novel The Infinities.

Banville has said that he imitated James Joyce as a boy: "After I'd read The Dubliners, and was struck at the way Joyce wrote about real life, I immediately started writing bad imitations of The Dubliners." The Guardian reports: "Banville himself has acknowledged that all Irish writers are followers of either Joyce or Beckett — and he places himself in the Beckett camp." He has also acknowledged other influences. During a 2011 interview on the program Charlie Rose, Rose asked, "The guiding light has always been Henry James?" and Banville replied, "I think so, I mean people say, you know, I've been influenced by Beckett or Nabokov but it's always been Henry James ... so I would follow him, I would be a Jamesian." Meanwhile, in a 2012 interview with Noah Charney, Banville cited W. B. Yeats and Henry James as the two real influences on his work. Responding to the suggestion that Fyodor Dostoevsky and Albert Camus were worthy comparisons, Banville said: "Dostoyevsky is such a bad writer it is hard to take him seriously... Ditto Camus".

Philosophy
He considers himself to be "incurably terrified of air travel", fearing "the plane going down amid the terrible shrieking of engines and passengers".

Women
Banville has often spoken and written of his admiration for women.

He is in favour of women's rights and has welcomed the gradual freedom that has come about in his native land during his lifetime, over the course of which Ireland changed from a country dominated by Roman Catholic ideology, where women were trapped in the home with little career opportunities and subject to restrictions on the availability of contraception, to a country where the position of women became more valued and where one woman could succeed another woman as the country's President, a role previously the exclusive preserve of men. On women in his own writing, Banville told Niamh Horan of the Sunday Independent in 2012: "I don't make a distinction between men and women. To me they are just people". Horan herself noted Banville's "special flair for writing about women and delving into the female psyche".

Banville contributed the introduction to Edna O'Brien's The Love Object: Selected Stories, praising her as "one of the most sophisticated writers now at work" and noting how it was "hard to think of any contemporary writer who could match [O'Brien's] combination of immediacy and sympathetic recall". He noted how "striking" is the figuring of O'Brien's characters and acknowledged that all her characters "are in some way damaged by the world, and specifically by the world of men". Banville concluded by describing O'Brien as "simply one of the finest writers of our time".

Banville dedicated himself to the task of writing the screenplay for an adaptation of Elizabeth Bowen's novel The Last September. Bowen's work was largely neglected at the time; Vintage published new editions of each of Bowen's novels and Hermione Lee's biography of her to coincide with its release. Banville later wrote the introduction for her Collected Stories.

Close to the literary editor Caroline Walsh, Banville spoke of his devastation upon learning of her death. He dedicated Ancient Light to her. Likewise, Banville was close to Eileen Battersby, at whose funeral he was moved to tears whilst reciting a poem in her memory.

Crime and punishment
Speaking to Niamh Horan in 2012, Banville related his thoughts on hurt and responsibility: "To hurt other people is the worst thing you can do. To be hurt oneself is bad enough, but hurting other people is unforgivable... Unforgivable. Literally unforgivable. I think that one has to take responsibility for one's life and one has to take responsibility for one's bad deeds as well as one's good deeds. One has to, as I say, be responsible... Failure in art, or failure in making a living, or a success — none of them compares, everything pales beside hurting other people, because, you know, we are here for such a short time and basic life itself is so hard one has a duty to try to be decent to other people".

Diet and conduct towards animals
Ben, a labrador, lived until the age of 11 before succumbing to cancer at Christmas 1980. Decades later Banville still regarded Ben as "a lost friend, and every few months he ambles into one of my dreams, snuffling and sighing and obviously wondering why there are no more walks. This may sound sentimental, but it does not feel that way".

On 21 August 2017, the RTÉ Radio 1 weekday afternoon show Liveline was discussing a report on Trinity College Dublin's use of 100,000 animals to conduct scientific research over the previous four years when a listener pointed out that Banville had previously raised the matter but been ignored. Banville personally telephoned Liveline to call the practice "absolutely disgraceful" and told the tale of how he had come upon some women protesting:  Asked if he received any other support for his stance in the letter he sent to The Irish Times, he replied:  This for Banville was a rare intervention of its kind, revealing to the public a different side — as he acknowledged when the presenter asked him if he had a history of objecting to activities such as blood sport:  When the subject of eating meat was raised, Banville responded: "I don't".

Awards and honours

Booker Prize

Banville wrote a letter in 1981 to The Guardian suggesting that the Booker Prize, for which he was "runner-up to the shortlist of contenders", be given to him so that he could use the money to buy every copy of the longlisted books in Ireland and donate them to libraries, "thus ensuring that the books not only are bought but also read – surely a unique occurrence".

When his novel The Book of Evidence was shortlisted for the 1989 Booker Prize, Banville said a friend — whom he described as "a gentleman of the turf" — instructed him "to bet on the other five shortlistees, saying it was a sure thing, since if I won the prize I would have the prize-money, and if I lost one of the others would win ... But the thing baffled me and I never placed the bets. I doubt I'll be visiting Ladbrokes any time soon".

Banville was not shortlisted for the Booker Prize again until 2005 when his novel The Sea was selected. The Sea was in contention alongside novels written by Julian Barnes, Sebastian Barry, Kazuo Ishiguro, Ali Smith and Zadie Smith. The chairman of the judges was John Sutherland. Earlier that year Sutherland had written approvingly of Ian McEwan's novel Saturday. Banville, however, dismissed the work in The New York Review of Books and expressed his dismay that McEwan was increasingly showing "a disturbing tendency toward mellowness". Anne Haverty later described Banville's critique of Saturday as "devastatingly effective". Sutherland sent a letter (signed with the title "Lord Northcliffe Professor Emeritus") in response to Banville's review, a letter in which he took Banville to task over his misreading of a game of squash in the novel. Banville issued a written reply with the opening line: "Summoned, one shuffles guiltily into the Department of Trivia", before begging Sutherland's pardon for his "sluggish comprehension" after managing to make his way through "all seventeen pages" of the game. Banville later admitted that, upon reading Sutherland's letter, he had thought: "[W]ell, I can kiss the Booker goodbye".

At the award ceremony, BBC Two's Kirsty Wark quizzed Financial Times arts editor Jan Dalley, the Independent on Sunday literary editor Suzi Feay and The Observer literary editor Robert McCrum. Banville, Barry and Ali Smith were dismissed outright and much of the discussion focused on Barnes, Ishiguro and Zadie Smith. In the end, the judges' vote was split between Banville and Ishiguro, with Rick Gekoski one of those favouring Banville. It fell to Sutherland to cast the winning vote; he did so in favour of Banville. Banville later said: "I have not been the most popular person in London literary circles over the past half-year. And I think it was very large of Sutherland to cast the winning vote in my favour".

When the prize rules later changed to allow entries by American writers, Banville welcomed the idea. However, he later expressed regret over the decision: "The prize was unique in its original form, but has lost that uniqueness. It is now just another prize among prizes. I am convinced the administrators should take the bold step of conceding the change was wrong, and revert".

Kafka Prize
In 2011, Banville was awarded the Franz Kafka Prize. Marcel Reich-Ranicki and John Calder featured on the jury. Banville described the award as "one of the ones one really wants to get. It's an old style prize and as an old codger it's perfect for me ... I've been wrestling with Kafka since I was an adolescent" and said his bronze statuette trophy "will glare at me from the mantelpiece".

Nobel Prize in Literature hoax
On the day that the 2019 and 2018 prizes were to be announced, the Swedish Academy's number appeared on Banville's telephone. A man purporting to be Permanent Secretary of the Swedish Academy Mats Malm told him he had won and even read out the customary citation and asked if he would prefer to be designated the 2018 or 2019 laureate. Banville was attending a physiotherapy appointment at the time and was lying face down on a couch when the call came. He had, however, retained a mobile telephone nearby, should he be contacted to give his view on a possible Irish winner. He informed his daughter; she called her father back while watching the live announcement at midday to tell him his name had not been mentioned. Banville telephoned everyone he had spoken to in the intervening period to tell them: "Don’t buy the champagne, stop throwing your hats in the air".

After the announcement, a voicemail to Banville (from the man posing as Malm) claimed the Swedish Academy had withdrawn his prize due to a disagreement. Banville felt sorry for the man purporting to be Malm: "He certainly sounded upset, he was a very good actor". But he then compared the speaker with a YouTube recording of the real Malm, at which point he realised that the speaker's voice was deeper than Malm, and Malm had a better grasp of English. However, when Banville rang the number back, he found himself in contact with the offices of the Swedish Academy. No sentient being spoke.

Banville called upon the Swedish Academy to investigate the incident "because I don't think the hoax was aimed at me, I think it was aimed at damaging the Academy or one or two members of the Academy". He described himself as "collateral damage". When informed of the incident, the real Malm said: "It sounds like a bad joke". Fellow Academy member Per Wästberg also thought it sounded like a "joke". Banville later elaborated on the experience: "I have the distinct impression that I wasn’t the target of this really. I think he assumed that I would believe him and that I would make a big fuss in the newspapers and say this is another dispute within the jury. I think that's what he expected me to do because that would embarrass the Academy. Specifically he was talking about some woman on it who was deeply into gender studies. So I suspect it was her that was the target. It wasn't done for fun. It has the hallmarks of a man with a grudge. Not a grudge against me". Banville provided the recording to the Swedish Academy to assist its investigation.

Banville responded well in spite the hoax; he was described in the Sunday Independent as being "as dignified and eloquent as ever in the face of a disappointment that made headlines around the world" and told The Observer: "There is some comedy in it and potential material: 'The man who nearly won the Nobel prize'". Media in Ireland described the trick played on Banville as "cruel", while media in neighbouring England described it as "deceitful". He received numerous sympathetic emails and telephone calls and support from fellow writers.

Works

 Nightspawn. London: Secker & Warburg, 1971
 Birchwood. London: Secker & Warburg, 1973
 The Revolutions Trilogy:
 Doctor Copernicus. London: Secker & Warburg, 1976
 Kepler. London: Secker & Warburg, 1981
 The Newton Letter. London: Secker & Warburg, 1982
 Mefisto. London: Secker & Warburg, 1986
 The Frames Trilogy
 The Book of Evidence. London: Secker & Warburg, 1989
 Ghosts. London: Secker & Warburg, 1993
 Athena. London: Secker & Warburg, 1995
 The Untouchable. London: Picador, 1997
 The Alexander and Cass Cleave Trilogy
 Eclipse. London: Picador, 2000
 Shroud. London: Picador, 2002
 Ancient Light. London: Viking Penguin, 2012
 The Sea. London: Picador, 2005
 The Infinities. London: Picador, 2009
 The Blue Guitar. London: Viking Penguin, 2015
 Mrs Osmond. London: Penguin, 2017
 Snow. London: Faber & Faber, 2020 
 April in Spain. London: Faber & Faber, 2021
 The Singularities (2022)

See also
 Roman à clef

References

Further reading
 Conversations with John Banville. Edited by Earl G. Ingersoll and John Cusatis (2020); University Press of Mississippi; ISBN 978-1-4968-2875-0
Irish University Review: A Journal of Irish Studies: Special Issue John Banville. Edited by Derek Hand (June 2006)
 Irish Writers on Writing featuring John Banville. Edited by Eavan Boland (Trinity University Press, 2007).
John Banville: A Critical Introduction by Rüdiger Imhof (1989); Wolfhound Press; 
 John Banville: A Critical Study by Joseph McMinn (1991); Gill and Macmillan; 
 John Banville and His Precursors edited by Pietra Palazzolo, Michael Springer, and Stephen Butler (2019); Bloomsbury Academic; ISBN 	978-1-3500-8452-0
 John Banville: Exploring Fictions by Derek Hand; (June 2002); Liffey Press; 
 John Banville by John Kenny; Irish Academic Press (2009); 
 John Banville by Neil Murphy; Bucknell University Press (2018); 
The Supreme Fictions of John Banville by Joseph McMinn; (October 1999); Manchester University Press;

External links

 
 John Banville at Aosdána
 
 John Banville at Ricorso (Irish Writers Database)
 John Banville  at the Berlin International Literature Festival
 
 
 John Banville — Audio interview with Donald Swaim concerning The Book of Evidence, 1990
 
Papers at Stuart A. Rose Manuscript, Archives, and Rare Book Library

 
1945 births
Living people
Aosdána members
Booker Prize winners
Fellows of the American Academy of Arts and Sciences
Fellows of the Royal Society of Literature
International Writing Program alumni
Irish male novelists
Irish mystery writers
Irish PEN Award for Literature winners
Irish male screenwriters
James Tait Black Memorial Prize recipients
People associated with animal welfare and rights
People from Wexford, County Wexford
Postmodern writers
The Irish Press people
The Irish Times people
The New York Review of Books people
20th-century Irish male writers
20th-century Irish novelists
21st-century Irish male writers
21st-century Irish novelists
20th-century pseudonymous writers
21st-century pseudonymous writers